Lucila Pini (30 October 1930 – 1974) was a Brazilian sprinter. She competed as part of Brazil's 4 x 100 metre relay team and in the women's 200 metres at the 1948 Summer Olympics.

References

External links
 

1930 births
1974 deaths
Athletes (track and field) at the 1948 Summer Olympics
Brazilian female sprinters
Olympic athletes of Brazil
Place of birth missing
Olympic female sprinters